Bradley Burton Knighton (born February 6, 1985) is an American former professional soccer player.

College and amateur soccer
Knighton played four years of college soccer at UNC-Wilmington as well as for Indiana Invaders in the USL Premier Development League.

Professional career
Undrafted by Major League Soccer, he attended a New England Revolution tryout in early 2007 and was good enough to be invited on trial for the preseason. He impressed during the trial in Bermuda, winning a spot as the Revolution's third-choice keeper and a developmental contract with the club.  The signing made him the first soccer player from UNC-Wilmington to be on a MLS roster.

After spending his first year and a half with the Revs behind Matt Reis and Doug Warren, he was loaned to the Portland Timbers on July 2, 2008, for the remainder of the 2008 Major League Soccer season. The move was aimed at getting Knighton some valuable playing time as he had seen no first team action while with New England.

Knighton was selected by Philadelphia Union in the 2009 MLS Expansion Draft on November 25, 2009. His first action with the team was a start in a friendly against Manchester United in which he allowed no goals before being replaced at halftime. He made his league debut for Philadelphia on August 8, 2010, against FC Dallas away, but was sent off for denying of an obvious goalscoring opportunity in 22nd minute. In his next start, he shut out the Chicago Fire at PPL Park on September 11, 2010, earning his first professional clean sheet, and also Philadelphia's first in franchise history. He was given a second consecutive start of the season vs. San Jose but was not able to hold down the starting position over the rest of the season, finishing with just 8 appearances.

On January 25, 2011, Knighton was waived by Philadelphia. In April 2011 he signed with Carolina RailHawks FC of the North American Soccer League.

Knighton signed with Vancouver Whitecaps FC of MLS in January 2012. After Joe Cannon, the starting goaltender for most of the season, had a blunder against the Portland Timbers in August 2012, Knighton established himself as the starting goalkeeper.

Knighton was traded back to New England in December 2013 in exchange for a conditional pick in the 2015 MLS SuperDraft.

Career statistics

Club

Honors
New England Revolution
 Supporters' Shield: 2021

NASL Best XI: 2011

References

External links

Portland Timbers profile

1985 births
Living people
American soccer players
American expatriate soccer players
Association football goalkeepers
North Carolina FC players
Expatriate soccer players in Canada
Indiana Invaders players
Major League Soccer players
New England Revolution players
New England Revolution II players
North American Soccer League players
People from Hickory, North Carolina
Philadelphia Union players
Portland Timbers (2001–2010) players
USL League Two players
Richmond Kickers players
Soccer players from North Carolina
University of North Carolina at Wilmington alumni
UNC Wilmington Seahawks men's soccer players
USL First Division players
USL Championship players
USL League One players
Vancouver Whitecaps FC players